North Armagh was a constituency of the Parliament of Northern Ireland.

Boundaries
North Armagh was a county constituency comprising the northern part of County Armagh. It was created when the House of Commons (Method of Voting and Redistribution of Seats) Act (Northern Ireland) 1929 introduced first-past-the-post elections throughout Northern Ireland. North Armagh was created by the division of Armagh into four new constituencies. The constituency survived unchanged, returning one member of Parliament, until the Parliament of Northern Ireland was temporarily suspended in 1972, and then formally abolished in 1973.

The seat was centred on the town of Lurgan and included parts of the rural districts of Armagh and Lurgan.

Politics 
The seat was always won by Ulster Unionist Party candidates.  It was contested on five occasions, three times by nationalist candidates, once by a Northern Ireland Labour Party member, and once by an independent Unionist.  The nationalist and Labour candidates each took 30 - 40% of the votes cast.

Members of Parliament

Election results 

At the 1929, 1933 and 1938 Northern Ireland general elections, John Johnston was elected unopposed.

At the 1953 Northern Ireland general election, Dinah McNabb was elected unopposed.

At the 1962 Northern Ireland general election, Dinah McNabb was elected unopposed.

References

Historic constituencies in County Armagh
Northern Ireland Parliament constituencies established in 1929
Constituencies of the Northern Ireland Parliament
Northern Ireland Parliament constituencies disestablished in 1973